Christian Henn (born 11 March 1964) is a German former road racing cyclist, who won the bronze medal for West Germany in the men's individual road race at the 1988 Summer Olympics in Seoul, South Korea. He also won the German National Road Race Championships in 1996. He was a professional rider from 1989 to 1999. After he retired after testing positive for testosterone, he admitted to doping.

He now works as a directeur sportif for UCI Continental team .

Major results

1988
3rd  Road race, Olympic Games
1989
8th Grand Prix Cerami
10th Grand Prix de la Libération
1992
2nd Paris–Tours
10th GP de Fourmies
1993
2nd Rund um Köln
4th Druivenkoers Overijse
9th Grote Prijs Jef Scherens
1994
1st  Overall Herald Sun Tour
1st Stage 7
5th Grand Prix de Wallonie
1995
1st Stage 13 Vuelta a España
3rd GP Ouest-France
3rd Circuito de Getxo
5th Druivenkoers Overijse
5th Clásica de Sabiñánigo
1996
1st  Road race, National Road Championships
1st Stage 2 Tour of Sweden
9th Overall Danmark Rundt
9th Overall Regio-Tour
1997
1st  Overall Bayern Rundfahrt
1st Stage 3a
1st  Overall Hessen Rundfahrt
1st Stage 3a Danmark Rundt
1st Flèche Ardennaise
2nd Overall Peace Race
1st Stage 6
2nd Tour de Berne
4th Giro del Piemonte
1998
1st Baden-Baden
4th Veenendaal–Veenendaal
1999
9th Overall Tour de Luxembourg

See also
 List of doping cases in cycling

References

External links

1964 births
Living people
German male cyclists
German sportspeople in doping cases
Cyclists at the 1988 Summer Olympics
Olympic cyclists of West Germany
Olympic bronze medalists for West Germany
Olympic medalists in cycling
Medalists at the 1988 Summer Olympics
Doping cases in cycling
German Vuelta a España stage winners
Sportspeople from Heidelberg
German cycling road race champions
Cyclists from Baden-Württemberg
Directeur sportifs
20th-century German people